was a Japanese swimmer. He competed at the 1932 Summer Olympics, where he won a gold medal in the 4 × 200 m freestyle relay event. He died in Kōchi, Japan.

External links

1913 births
1945 deaths
Year of death uncertain
Olympic swimmers of Japan
Swimmers at the 1932 Summer Olympics
Olympic gold medalists for Japan
People from Kōchi, Kōchi
World record setters in swimming
Japanese male freestyle swimmers
Medalists at the 1932 Summer Olympics
Olympic gold medalists in swimming
20th-century Japanese people